Ceratozamia hildae, commonly known as the bamboo cycad, is a species of cycad in the family Zamiaceae that is endemic to Mexico. It is native to the Huasteca Potosina of Querétaro and San Luis Potosí, near the Santa Maria River. It is threatened by habitat loss and over-collecting.

It is the only cycad with more than two sets of leaflets per leaf internode.

References

External links

hildae
Endemic flora of Mexico
Flora of Querétaro
Flora of San Luis Potosí
Endangered biota of Mexico
Endangered plants
Plants described in 1979
Taxonomy articles created by Polbot